Third Avenue Historic District may refer to:

Third Avenue and North High Historic District, Columbus, Ohio, listed on the NRHP in Columbus, Ohio 
Third Avenue Historic District (Leavenworth, Kansas), listed on the NRHP in Leavenworth County, Kansas 
Third Avenue Historic District (Kenosha, Wisconsin)
Third Avenue Historic District (Sturgeon Bay, Wisconsin)